Zhuldyz Eshimova (born 2 January 1988 in Talas) is a Kyrgyz-born female wrestler who competes for Kazakhstan.  At the 2012 Summer Olympics, she competed in the women's -48 kg freestyle division, losing to Vanessa Kolodinskaya in the second round.  At the 2016 Summer Olympics, she competed in the same division.  She lost to eventual gold medalist Eri Tosaka in her first match.  Because Tosaka reached the gold medal round, Eshimova took part in the repechage.  She beat Haley Augello in the first round of the repechage, but lost to Sun Yanan in her bronze medal match.

In 2022, she competed at the Yasar Dogu Tournament held in Istanbul, Turkey. She won the bronze medal in her event at the 2022 Asian Wrestling Championships held in Ulaanbaatar, Mongolia. She competed in the 53kg event at the 2022 World Wrestling Championships held in Belgrade, Serbia.

References

External links 
 

Living people
1988 births
People from Talas Region
Kazakhstani female sport wrestlers
Kyrgyzstani female sport wrestlers
Wrestlers at the 2012 Summer Olympics
Wrestlers at the 2016 Summer Olympics
Kyrgyzstani emigrants to Kazakhstan
Olympic wrestlers of Kazakhstan
Wrestlers at the 2006 Asian Games
Wrestlers at the 2010 Asian Games
World Wrestling Championships medalists
Wrestlers at the 2018 Asian Games
Medalists at the 2018 Asian Games
Asian Games silver medalists for Kazakhstan
Asian Games medalists in wrestling
Asian Wrestling Championships medalists
21st-century Kyrgyzstani women
21st-century Kazakhstani women